Achterhooks is a Westphalian dialect spoken in Gelderland.

Geographic distribution
The Achterhooks language is spoken in the Netherlands in western Europe, Northeast, with speakers concentrated in Gelderland Province.

Status
The language was recognized by the government of the Netherlands in 1996 (as being part of Low Saxonian).

The speech variety has had some growth and development, with Bible portions translated in 2002.

References

Achterhoek
Dutch Low Saxon
Westphalian dialects
Languages of the Netherlands
Culture of Gelderland